The 2000 FIVB Volleyball World League was the 11th edition of the annual men's international volleyball tournament, played by 12 countries from 26 May to 16 July 2000. The Final Round was held in Rotterdam, Netherlands.

Pools composition

Intercontinental round

Pool A

|}

|}

Pool B

|}

|}

Pool C

|}

|}

Final round
Venue:  Rotterdam Ahoy, Rotterdam, Netherlands

Pool play

|}

|}

Finals

3rd place match

|}

Final

|}

Final standing

Awards
Most Valuable Player
  Andrea Sartoretti
Best Server
  Goran Vujević
Best Spiker
  Guido Görtzen
Best Blocker
  Martin van der Horst

External links
2000 World League Results
Sports123

FIVB Volleyball World League
FIVB World League
Ronde
Volleyball